Now For Plan A is the twelfth studio album by Canadian rock band, The Tragically Hip. At a length of 39:18, it is the band's shortest album. The album's first single, "At Transformation", was released on May 18, 2012. The album's second single, "Streets Ahead", was released to radio on August 24. On September 25, the band made the album available to stream online in its entirety via SoundCloud. The album was nominated for Rock Album of the Year at the 2013 Juno Awards.

Commercial performance
Now For Plan A debuted at #3 on the Canadian Albums Chart. It was the band's first album since their 1991 release Road Apples to debut lower than the number two position on the chart. The album sold 12,000 copies in its first week, less than half of the first week sales of the band's two previous albums, 2009's We Are the Same and 2006's World Container. In the United States, the album debuted at #129 on the Billboard 200, the band's highest position on that chart in their history. The album was certified gold in Canada on January 14, 2013.

Track listing
All tracks written by Gordon Downie and The Tragically Hip.

Charts

References

2012 albums
The Tragically Hip albums
Universal Music Canada albums
Albums produced by Gavin Brown (musician)
Albums recorded at Noble Street Studios